Maylandia barlowi is a species of cichlid endemic to Lake Malawi where it is only known from the area around the Maleri Islands where it prefers areas with soft substrates.  This species can reach a length of  SL.  It is also found in the aquarium trade. The specific name of this species honours the ichthyologist George W. Barlow (1929-2007).

References

barlowi
Fish of Lake Malawi
Fish of Malawi
Fish described in 1986
Taxobox binomials not recognized by IUCN
Taxonomy articles created by Polbot